Fazlić is a Bosnian patronymic surname formed by adding the Slavic diminutive suffix -ić to the masculine given name of Arabic origin Fazli (derived from the adjective فضيل = excellent, virtuous, deserving) and may refer to:

 Dino Fazlic (born 1991), German footballer
 Husnija Fazlić (1943-2022), Yugoslav former footballer
 Jasmin Fazlić Jala (born 1986), Bosnian rapper
 Jasna Fazlić (born 1970), former Bosnian-American table tennis player
 Kemal Fazlić (born 1995), Bosnian handball player
 Miralem Fazlić (born 1947), Bosnian former footballer
 Salih Fazlić (born 1975), Bosnian volleyball player
 Šuhret Fazlić (born 1961), Bosnian politician

References

Bosnian surnames
Patronymic surnames